CVA may refer to:

Education
 Carrabassett Valley Academy, a ski and snowboard academy, Maine, US
 College of Visual Arts, Minnesota, US
 Conservatorium van Amsterdam, a conservatory of music in the Netherlands
 Contextual value added, UK school statistic
 Cyber Village Academy, Saint Paul, Minnesota, US

Veterinary
 Common Veterinary Area, as defined by the agreement between the EU and the Swiss Confederation
 Certified Veterinary Assistant, a professional designation in the U.S.

Military
 US Navy hull classification symbol for attack aircraft carriers
 Cape Town Volunteer Artillery, South Africa, now Cape Field Artillery

Economics
 Credit Valuation Adjustment, the market value of counterparty credit risk
 Company voluntary arrangement, UK, for companies in insolvency

Other
 CVA (album), by Paint It Black
 Cerebrovascular accident or stroke
 Christian Vegetarian Association
 Corpus vasorum antiquorum, documenting ancient ceramics
 Conservation Volunteers Australia, an Australian organization to provide better environment
 cis-vaccenyl acetate, an insect pheromone